Sahibzada Mohammad Tariq Khan Afridi (born 8 October 1973), known as Tariq Afridi, is a Pakistani cricketer.

Early life
Afridi belongs to a family of Sufi pirs (teachers or spiritual masters) and his grandfather Maulana Muhammad Ilyas was a well-known spiritual figure in Bhutan Sharif, a locality in the Tirah Valley. His other grandfather, Sahibzada Abdul Baqi, was given the title Ghazi-e-Kashmir (conqueror of Kashmir) for his efforts during the Indo-Pakistani War of 1947–1948. His brother Shahid Afridi, is a former captain of the Pakistani cricket team.  His other brother, Ashfaq Afridi, also played domestic cricket.

Domestic career

List A career
Afridi made his List A debut for Karachi Whites against Sargodha during the 1990-91 Wills Gold Flake League on 28 December 1990. Afridi got figures of 0/13 (3 overs) and didn't bat as Karachi won by 6 wickets. Afridi played his second and final List A match against Rawalpindi on 11 January 1991. Afridi scored 0* (1) and got figures of 0/40 (4 overs). Rawalpindi won the match by 4 wickets.

First-class career
Afridi made his first-class debut for Karachi Blues against Islamabad during the 1999/00 Quaid-e-Azam Trophy on 6 November 1999. In the first innings, he scored 3 (17) and didn't bowl. The second innings did not take place. The match ended with a draw. In Afridi's second and last first-class match, he played against Peshawar on 20 November 1999. In the first innings, Tariq got figures of 2/37 (12 overs) and scored 26 (83). In the second innings, Tariq scored 1 (22) and got figures of 0/9 (2 overs). Peshawar went on to win the match by 4 wickets.

References

External links
 
 Tariq Afridi at Pakistan Cricket Board

1973 births
Afridi people
Living people
Pakistani cricketers
People from Peshawar
Karachi Blues cricketers
Karachi Whites cricketers